André Ballieux (born 2 August 1933) is a Belgian middle-distance runner. He competed in the men's 1500 metres at the 1956 Summer Olympics.

References

1933 births
Living people
Athletes (track and field) at the 1956 Summer Olympics
Belgian male middle-distance runners
Olympic athletes of Belgium
Place of birth missing (living people)